Jean Lowe is a California-based painter and sculptor. She creates installations and sculptural works of enamel-painted papier-mâché.

Education and career
Lowe earned a B.A. from UC Berkeley in 1983. She earned her MFA from UC San Diego in 1988.

She was a lecturer at UC San Diego from 1992 to 2008.

Works

Installations
Lowe's installations are handmade, labor intensive and visually playful installations with papier-mâché furnishings and objects juxtaposed to site specific wall painting. Lowe says of her installations, "Intellectually I am driven by an interest in challenging a status quo anthropocentric world view and formally interested in marrying that content to a 'domestic' decorative esthetic."

Many of Lowe's installations have quoted 18th and 19th century French decoration, rife with romanticized images of animals and nature and imbued with a sense of class and privilege. Into this fabric she substitutes or integrate corresponding contemporary attitudes--both about our treatment of the land and its other inhabitants and our attitudes regarding decoration: the wrestling match between high and low art.

Jean Lowe, Accomplishments of Man, The California Center for the Arts, Escondido, CA, 1995.

Jean Lowe, Carpet Showroom | Quint Gallery, 2019

Books
Lowe creates sculptural representations of everyday objects using papier-mâché and enamel paint. She is known for her papier-mâché books and has created a large collection of them with evocative and amusing titles. Her work Books and Ideas in an Age of Anxiety comprises a collection of them in display cases and is situated in Byers Hall at UCSF as part of the J. Michael Bishop Art Collection at Mission Bay.

Among the book titles are:

Accelerated Zen Buddhism: How to Win at the Hereafter
Achieve and Maintain a More Powerful Delusion
Anxiety: The Unexploited Weight Loss Tool
Artistic Mammography
Back to Nature: The Notes of Marie Antoinette
Biblical Family Values
Cachet: What It Is & How to Get It
Close But Not Close Enough: The Case for Primate Experimentation
Craft Your Way to Mental Health
The Death of Painting
The Eco-Tourist's Guide to Las Vegas
Foreclosure Etiquette
Freedom from Rigor & Competence
Great Biceps: In 20 to Life
Great Golf Courses of the World
A Guide to Box Wines
Help Me Make Up My Mind, Lord
The High Fiber Diet
A History of Genital Warts
Hormones and Behavior
Hot Buttered Cop Porn
How to Dominate Women
If God Loves Me, Why Am I Living in My Van?
If God Loves Me, Why Do I Need a Vibrator?
The Jesus Workout
Jet-Skiing Mother Ganges
The Joy of Pickling
Just Ask God: Washboard Abs for Life
Kindle: The Missing Manual
Leadership and You
Liposuction of the Jowls
Militant Feminist Veganism for All
Narcissism and You
Nutritainment
Perfect Poultry: Best Recipes from the Audubon Silver Circle Club
Premature Articulation
A Quotidian Guide to the Basics
Rekindling your Passion for What Might Have Been
Rethinking the Koran
Something Awesome Is Coming Your Way
String Theory
Torture Preparedness
Tough Love and your Elderly Parents
The Triumph of Minimalism
Yosemite: Observations from Behind the Wheel
The Way Things Work: Build Your Own Guillotine
What Would Satan Eat?
When to Tell Your Husband He's Adopted
Who's Who in American Pre-Schools
Who's Who in American Prisons
Who's Who in the Multiverse
Yes, Yes, Yes!
Yoga and Stress Reduction
Your Soul: Fixer Upper or Teardown?

Exhibitions
Lowe has exhibited in both New York and Los Angeles. She participated in the 1994 exhibition Bad Girls West. In 1995 she collaborated on the installation Bull Story with artist Kim MacConnel.

Lowe's 2012 exhibition Hey Sexy! blended foregrounds depicting imagery from consumer culture with baroque decor backgrounds of the 17th, 18th, and 19th centuries. The exhibition incorporated sculptural objects such as tissue boxes, cases of beer, and a store where sculptural recreations of commodities are sold.

Lowe's work frequently employs satire. In a review of her 2014 exhibition at Rosamund Felsen Gallery, Leah Ollman of the Los Angeles Times wrote that she "stabs satirically at broad-scale practices of deception, as well as personal patterns of self-deception."

Lowe's works are included in the collections of the San Diego Museum of Art, The New Children's Museum, and the Museum of Contemporary Art San Diego.

Awards and honors
Lowe has twice received fellowships from the Western States Arts Federation/NEA and has received a grant from the Pollock-Krasner Foundation. She was also awarded the CalArts Alpert/Ucross Residency Prize. She won the Alberta duPont Bonsal Foundation Art Prize in 2000. She was also the recipient of the 2006/2007 San Diego Art Prize.

Personal life
Lowe lives in Encinitas and is married to artist Kim MacConnel.

References

External links
Jean Lowe at Quint Gallery

1960 births
Living people
20th-century American women artists
21st-century American women artists
American women painters
American women sculptors
Painters from California
University of California, Berkeley alumni
University of California, San Diego alumni
University of California, San Diego faculty
Sculptors from California